Ingvild Stensland (born 3 August 1981) is a former Norwegian footballer who, from August 2022, is one of the assistance coaches on Norway women's national team.

As a player she last played for Stabæk FK in the Toppserien. She played as a midfielder and was a member of, and for several years also the captain of, the Norway women's national team, making her debut in 2003. She has also played in the French Division 1 and the Swedish Damallsvenskan for Olympique Lyon and Göteborg FC.

Playing career
Stensland was born in Farsund in the south of Norway and grew up at nearby Lyngdal showing her talent for football at an early age. She grew up in a footballing family. Her father was a coach, while her older sisters played at Lyngdal IL. As a youth, Stensland trained with her male counterparts at Lyngdal until she reached her teens. She had a successful career with Lyngdal before starring for clubs such as FK Donn, Athene Moss, and Kolbotn in her home country Norway, Kopparbergs/Göteborg FC in Sweden, and Lyon in France. In 2005, Stensland was named the Toppserien Player of the Year. She has also been nominated for the FIFA Women's World Player of the Year award on four occasions.

As a national team player, Stensland played in the 2005 European Championships guiding her team to a second-place finish after falling 3–1 to the Germans in the final. Since making her debut in 2003, Stensland has become a regular in the team appearing at the 2007 FIFA Women's World Cup, the 2008 Summer Olympics, UEFA Women's Euro 2009 and the 2011 FIFA Women's World Cup.

At the beginning of 2009, Ingvild Stensland signed a contract with top French club, Olympique Lyonnaise. At about the same time she took over as captain of the national team, an appointment that was confirmed by the new chief trainer, Eli Landsem, at the end of 2009. In 2011, she returned to Göteborg, with whom she won the Svenska Cupen. After the end of the season she returned to Norway to play for Stabæk FK.

Coaching career 
In January 2018, Stensland got hired as player developer in Stabæk. In 2022, she continued her career as coach of the Norway women under-23 national team. However, in August 2022, she became one of the assistance coaches for the Norway national team, together with Monica Knudsen, with Hege Riise as the head coach.

Honours

Individual
 2005 Toppserien Player of the Year
 2008 Norwegian Women's Player of the Year (NISO)

References

External links

Entry in Store norske leksikon
Kopparberg/ Göteborg player profile page

1981 births
Living people
People from Farsund
People from Lyngdal
Norwegian women's footballers
Women's association football midfielders
Norway women's international footballers
Olympic footballers of Norway
Footballers at the 2008 Summer Olympics
Expatriate women's footballers in France
Athene Moss players
BK Häcken FF players
Olympique Lyonnais Féminin players
Stabæk Fotball Kvinner players
Expatriate women's footballers in Sweden
FIFA Century Club
2011 FIFA Women's World Cup players
2007 FIFA Women's World Cup players
Division 1 Féminine players
Damallsvenskan players
Sportspeople from Agder